U.S. Route 16 (US 16) is an east–west United States Highway between Rapid City, South Dakota and Yellowstone National Park in Wyoming. The highway's eastern terminus is at a junction with Interstate 90/U.S. Route 14 (I-90/US 14), concurrent with I-190, in Rapid City, South Dakota. The western terminus is the east entrance to Yellowstone National Park, concurrent with US 14 and US 20.  U.S. 16 used to extend all the way to Michigan, but has been truncated in favor of Interstates 90 and 96.  A ballot initiative that passed in 2022, allocated funds to extend U.S. 16 through both Joe Creek and Peoria Flats.

Route description

Wyoming
US 16 begins at the east entrance to Yellowstone National Park, along with US 14 and the eastern segment of US 20. From the park, the three highways run concurrently to Cody and Greybull. In Greybull, US 14 splits off to the east, while US 16/US 20 head due south to Basin and Worland. In Worland, US 16 splits off from US 20, and heads east over the Powder River Pass on its way to the city of Buffalo. After passing Buffalo, US 16 arches north to the community of Ucross, meeting US 14 again, before arching back south to Gillette. US 16 then runs east concurrently with I-90 between Gillette and Moorcroft before heading southeast to the towns of Upton and Newcastle. The highway then heads east to the South Dakota state line. For most of the way through the state, the highway is a two-lane road.

South Dakota

US 16 is also known as Mount Rushmore Road in western South Dakota. From the state line, the highway travels near Jewel Cave, the third-longest cave in the world. The highway goes through the city of Custer and shares alignment with US 385. East of Hill City, US 16 splits off US 385. It then becomes a four-lane divided highway, with the two roadways separated by up to a half-mile (0.8 km) in some places, including the old gold-mining town of Rockerville, South Dakota, which is contained entirely between the two roadways.  In Rapid City, a truck bypass runs along Catron Boulevard and Elk Vale Road up to Exit 61 on I-90.

The South Dakota section of US 16 is defined at South Dakota Codified Laws § 31-4-138.

History

US 16 originally connected Detroit with Yellowstone, including a ferry link across Lake Michigan between Muskegon, Michigan, and Milwaukee, Wisconsin. In Michigan, the route was in use long before automobiles and was known to white settlers as the Grand River Road, and prior to the designation of US Routes in 1926, had been designated as M-16 in the 1920s from Detroit to south of Muskegon.  In 1938, reflectorized discs were placed on US-16 every  from Detroit to Lansing, resulting in fewer nighttime traffic accidents.  Other states would later do the same on their roads.

US 16 initially crossed the South Dakota – Wyoming state line west of Spearfish. U.S. Route 216 was commissioned in 1930 as a loop off US 16 to the south between Rapid City and Moorcroft, crossing the state line west of Custer. In 1934, US 16 was moved to the US 216 alignment, while the former US 16 became part of an extension of US 14.

In Michigan, most of US 16 was superseded by I-96 and a segment of Grand River Avenue in Detroit ultimately became M-5. US 16 was later decommissioned in Wisconsin, Minnesota, and eastern South Dakota to its present termini.

Between Rapid City and Dexter, Minnesota, it has been supplanted by I-90. In Faribault County, Minnesota the highway took on another number as there was already a county highway 16. Residents of the county continued referring to the road as "16" or "old 16" and eventually the county renumbered it as Faribault County 16. From the county's western border with Martin County, 16 continues East through the city of Blue Earth as part of 1st Street and Leland Parkway until it briefly combines with US-169/Grove Street. One half mile south of that point at the intersection of Grove and 7th Streets, County 16 follows 7th Street and continues East to the border of Freeborn County. Most of the stretch through Faribault County is a relatively narrow 2 lane highway with wide gravel shoulders that has been widened at least two times since US-16 was decommissioned. East of Dexter it is now Minnesota State Highway 16 and Wisconsin Highway 16. In South Dakota it was replaced by various state highways (including SD 38 and 248) and county roads: generally, in West River the old alignment was transferred to county responsibility entirely, while in East River it remained a state-maintained highway.

An older Alternate US 16 in South Dakota has become South Dakota Highway 240.

In South Dakota, in 2009, the South Dakota Department of Transportation designated US-16/US-385 between Custer and Hill City, which passes by the Crazy Horse Memorial, now being carved in the Black Hills, the Crazy Horse Memorial Highway. This segment of US-385 is also a part of the George Hearst Memorial Highway.

Major intersections
Mileage resets at the state line crossing.

See also

Related routes
 U.S. Route 116
 U.S. Route 216

Special and suffixed routes
U.S. Route 16A in South Dakota
Special routes of U.S. Route 16

References

External links

Endpoints of US 16
Highways and Gas Stations- US Hwy 16 Page
 1937 South Dakota Transportation Map
 1930 Minnesota Transportation Map
  1937 Wisconsin Transportation Map

 
16
16
16
Transportation in Park County, Wyoming
Transportation in Big Horn County, Wyoming
Transportation in Washakie County, Wyoming
Transportation in Johnson County, Wyoming
Transportation in Campbell County, Wyoming
Transportation in Crook County, Wyoming
Transportation in Weston County, Wyoming
Transportation in Custer County, South Dakota
Transportation in Pennington County, South Dakota
16
16